Mordellistena austrina is a beetle in the genus Mordellistena of the family Mordellidae. It was described in 1895 by George Charles Champion.

References

austrina
Beetles described in 1895